Platymeris is a genus of assassin bug (Reduviidae).  Platymeris species are often used in laboratories and as pets. The venom of this genus has been studied in a laboratory setting.

Species
 Platymeris biguttatus (Linnaeus, 1767)
 Platymeris charon Jeannel, 1917
 Platymeris erebus Distant, 1902
 Platymeris flavipes Bergroth, 1920
 Platymeris guttatipennis Stål, 1859
 Platymeris insignis Germar & Berendt, 1856
 Platymeris kavirondo Jeannel, 1917
 Platymeris laevicollis Distant, 1919
 Platymeris nigripes Villiers, 1944
 Platymeris pyrrhula Germar, 1837
 Platymeris rhadamanthus Gerstaecker, 1873
 Platymeris rufipes Jeannel, 1917
 Platymeris swirei Distant, 1919

References

External links
 "Bugs of the World" by George McGavin,  
 "Insects, Spiders and Other Terrestrial Arthropods" by George McGavin

Reduviidae